Deborah Kaufman Placey (born March 17, 1966) is an American sportscaster who currently co-hosts the television program, NHL Live, with EJ Hradek on the NHL Network, as well as The BlackBerry All-Access Pregame show on NHL.com. On September 6, 2018, MSG Network announced Placey was leaving the regional sports network to take a new on-air position with the NHL Network.

Placey had previously served as a news anchor/reporter for the New Jersey Devils' televised games on MSG Plus and the MSG Network. Placey joined the New Jersey Devils in 2011 after 10 seasons as pre-game and intermission host for New York Islanders telecasts. Placey's earlier TV anchor work includes stops at WSIL-TV in Carterville, Illinois, KWWL-TV in Waterloo, Iowa, WPRI-TV in Providence, Rhode Island and WSVN-TV in Miami, Florida.

Prior to joining MSG in the mid-1990s, Placey regularly appeared on ESPN2 at the time of ESPN2's infancy (October 1993) through mid-1995. From 2004 through 2005, Placey worked as a fill-in weekend sports anchor and reporter for WNBC-TV, the flagship NBC affiliate.

Born and raised in St. Louis, Missouri, Deb Placey is married to Edward Placey, a senior coordinating producer at ESPN. The Placeys have two daughters, Madeline and Caroline, and a beagle named Lucky.

References

External links
MSG biography
Deb Placey's Twitter Account

National Hockey League broadcasters
New Jersey Devils announcers
New York Liberty announcers
Women's National Basketball Association announcers
New York Islanders announcers
1966 births
Living people